Saint Joseph of Cupertino School is a parochial school located in Cupertino, California. It serves grades pre-k to 8. It is part of the Roman Catholic Diocese of San Jose in California.

The school is accredited by the Western Association of Schools and Colleges (WASC) and the Western Catholic Educational Association (WCEA).

External links
 School website

References

Catholic elementary schools in California